Kalevi Viskari (15 June 1928 – 13 November 2018) was a Finnish gymnast who competed in the 1952 Summer Olympics. He was born in Enso.

References

External links
 

1928 births
2018 deaths
Finnish male artistic gymnasts
Olympic gymnasts of Finland
Gymnasts at the 1952 Summer Olympics
Olympic bronze medalists for Finland
Olympic medalists in gymnastics
Medalists at the 1952 Summer Olympics
20th-century Finnish people